Emad Al-Dossari (Arabic:عماد الدوسري; born 8 January 1990) is a football (soccer) player who plays for as a Al-Thoqbah as a winger, most recently for Al-Nahda.

External links
 http://www.slstat.com/spl2013-2014ar/player.php?id=1084

1990 births
Living people
Saudi Arabian footballers
Al-Nahda Club (Saudi Arabia) players
Ettifaq FC players
Al-Fayha FC players
Al-Taraji Club players
Al-Thoqbah Club players
Saudi First Division League players
Saudi Professional League players
Saudi Second Division players
Saudi Fourth Division players
Saudi Third Division players
Association football midfielders